Thomas William Robertson (9 January 1829 – 3 February 1871) was an English dramatist and stage director.

Born to a theatrical family, Robertson began as an actor, but he was not a success and gave up acting in his late 20s. After earning a modest living writing articles for the press, translating and adapting foreign plays and writing several of his own plays he achieved success in 1865 with his play Society, which the actor-manager Marie Wilton presented at a small London theatre, the Prince of Wales's. Over the next five years Robertson wrote five more plays for the Prince of Wales's. Their naturalistic style and treatment of contemporary social issues was in strong contrast to the melodramas and exaggerated theatricality to which the public had been accustomed, and Robertson's plays were box-office and critical successes. Robertson supervised their productions and was a pioneer of modern stage directing.

Among later theatrical figures influenced by Robertson's Prince of Wales's plays and productions were W. S. Gilbert, Arthur Wing Pinero, Bernard Shaw and Harley Granville-Barker. Robertson wrote numerous plays for other theatres, and adapted many foreign plays for the English stage, but few of these made a strong or lasting impression. He strove successfully to improve the financial condition of dramatists, securing payment per performance, a basis that became the norm after his death.

Robertson suffered from heart disease and died at the age of 42 at the height of his fame and popularity.

Life and career

Early years
Robertson was born in Newark-upon-Trent, Nottinghamshire on 9 January 1829. He came from a long-established theatrical family, active on the English stage since the early 18th century, and was the eldest son of William Shaftoe Robertson and his wife, Margharetta Elisabetta (née Marinus), a Danish-born actress. Robertson senior had been articled to a lawyer, but abandoned the law to become an actor, and was taken on by his uncle's Lincoln Circuit Company, of which he afterwards became manager. Many of Robertson's large family of siblings went on the stage, including his brothers Frederick and Edward, and his sisters Fanny, Elizabeth and Margaret, the last subsequently famous as Madge Kendal. He made his first appearance on the stage in June 1834 at the age of five as Hamish, the son of the title character in Rob Roy, and played roles including Cora's child in Sheridan's Pizarro and the Count's child in Kotzebue's The Stranger.

At the age of seven Robertson was sent to Spalding Academy, and then to a school in Whittlesey, acting with the family's theatrical company during the school holidays. When he was about 15 his schooling ceased and he rejoined the company full-time,  not only as an actor, but also, according to his biographer Michael R. Booth, "as a scene painter, songwriter, playwright, prompter, and stage-manager". He wrote stage adaptations of Dickens stories for the company: "The Battle of Life" and "The Haunted Man". Apart from a brief and unsuccessful spell in the Netherlands as an English teacher, he remained with the company until its disbandment in 1849.

London
Robertson moved to London, earning a meagre living, writing and taking such acting parts as he could get. His biographer T. Edgar Pemberton wrote, "The amount of work that he did there during his early struggling days was prodigious. In addition to writing and adapting plays he contributed stories, essays, and verses to many magazines: dramatic criticisms to several newspapers: and ephemeral work to numerous comic journals".

In 1851 Robertson had a new play presented in the West End, A  Night's Adventure, a comic drama set in the time of the Jacobite rising of 1745. He hoped this would be start of a successful career as a dramatist, but the play was not a success, closing after four nights, and he continued to scratch a living as a writer and actor. Together with H. J. Byron, who became a close friend, he put on an entertainment at the Gallery of Illustration, without success. He worked as a prompter at the Olympic Theatre, tried unsuccessfully to join the army, and travelled to Paris with a company giving a season of English plays there. In 1855, while playing at the Queen's Theatre, he met a 19-year-old actress, Elizabeth Burton. They were married in July the following year; they had a son and three daughters. After their wedding the Robertsons toured Ireland before returning to act in London and the provinces. From 1858 Robertson, feeling that the life of a touring actor left no time for the serious business of writing plays, gave up acting and concentrated on writing.

Robertson's farcical sketch The Cantab, staged as an after-piece at the Strand Theatre in February 1861, attracted the attention of a Bohemian literary set, and led to his becoming a member of the Savage, Arundel and Reunion Clubs, where, in the words of his biographer Joseph Knight, "he enlarged his observation of human nature, and whence he drew some curious types". Among the up-and-coming writers with whom he mixed were F. C. Burnand, W. S. Gilbert, Tom Hood and Clement Scott. When Byron founded the magazine Fun in 1861, Robertson was a contributor from the outset. Writers for magazines and papers were seldom well paid, and to maintain a modest income Robertson wrote copiously: Pemberton lists a dozen publications to which he contributed in this period, ranging from Beeton's Englishwoman's Domestic Magazine and The Boy's Own Magazine to London Society and The Illustrated Times. Success remained elusive, and Robertson considered giving up writing and becoming a tobacconist.

Success

An important step to success came in 1864, when Robertson wrote David Garrick, an adaptation of Mélesville's comedy Sullivan. Edward Sothern staged the piece and starred in it. The actor was at the height of his popularity, and although the notices paid more attention to his performance than to Robertson's writing, the success of the production advanced the author's career. Encouraged by this professional achievement, he wrote a new play, Society, a comedy depicting what one critic called "the efforts of an illiterate millionaire to introduce his son into 'society', and the equally vigorous efforts of 'society' to repel the intruder". This play was his breakthrough. London managements turned it down, but through Byron's influence it was produced in Liverpool, where it was a critical and popular success.

Byron was a professional associate of Marie Wilton, who had recently taken over the management of one of London's smaller theatres, the Prince of Wales's. At his instigation Society was presented there on 11 November 1865. In a highly favourable notice the reviewer in The Times wrote, "The piece was vehemently applauded from beginning to end. Success could not be more unequivocal". Society ran for 26 weeks – 150 performances – a notable run for the time, establishing the fortunes of the theatre, as well as those of the author. It was revived several times during the next two decades, and was given nearly 500 performances under Wilton's (later the Bancrofts') management.  Between the Liverpool and London openings, Robertson suffered the loss of his wife, who died on 14 August after months of ill health.

Robertson wrote the libretto of the 1865 one-act comic opera Constance, with music by Frederic Clay. It was well reviewed when presented at Covent Garden, but ran only briefly, and Robertson did not return to the musical theatre. In 1869 Clay asked him for a second libretto, but he declined and instead gave Clay an introduction to "a better man than I shall ever be", namely Gilbert, who collaborated with Clay on the successful Ages Ago.

The success of Society established Robertson as a playwright and enabled him have a decisive voice in the staging of his subsequent plays. His next, the comedy Ours, was first given in August 1866 at the Prince of Wales's, Liverpool under his personal direction with a cast that included Wilton, Squire Bancroft (her future husband and partner) and John Hare. The play transferred to the Prince of Wales's in London the following month and ran for 150 performances. The Times remarked on the "ultra-real" nature of the piece and of its staging.

"A complete reformation of the modern drama"
During the run of Ours, Robertson, Gilbert, Scott and others contributed short stories to a collection edited by Tom Hood.  Robertson's, "The Poor-Rate Unfolds a Tale", formed the basis for his next play at the Prince of Wales's, but before that he had two plays staged at other London theatres: Shadow-Tree Shaft, a drama, at the Princess's, and A Rapid Thaw, an adaptation of a Sardou comedy, at the St James's. In April 1867 his stage version of the short story opened at the Prince of Wales's under the title Caste. In this piece Robertson developed the naturalistic, unexaggerated style for which he was becoming famous. Both as author and director he avoided the over-theatrical bombast of the early Victorian theatre. After the first night of Caste one critic wrote:

Gilbert, looking back in 1901, considered Caste Robertson's masterpiece, a judgement with which analysts in the 20th and 21st centuries have concurred. The play ran for 156 performances and was revived for several further runs during the rest of the 19th century.

In 1867 Robertson remarried. His second wife was Rosetta Elizabeth Rodmill Feist (1844–1912), whom he had met at a party in London in 1866. They became engaged in August 1867, married at the British consulate in Frankfurt on 17 October, and honeymooned in Paris. They had a daughter and a son. Once back in London, Robertson continued to write and direct. In February 1868 Play was produced at the Prince of Wales's. It ran for 106 performances and was followed by a successful revival of Society. In the same year Robertson adapted Alfred de Musset's 1834 play On ne badine pas avec l'amour for his sister Madge. As Passion Flowers it was staged under Robertson's direction at the Theatre Royal, Hull and on tour.

Robertson had written Society with Sothern in mind, but the actor had been unavailable. In late 1868 Robertson adapted Émile Augier's comedy  L'Aventurière, presented at the Haymarket as Home, with Sothern in the lead role in January 1869. It had a good run of 136 performances, but was outstripped by Robertson's School – loosely based on Roderich Benedix's Aschenbrödel – which opened at the Prince of Wales's in the same month and ran for 381 performances.

Last years

Robertson's last Liverpool premiere was on 22 February 1869. My Lady Clara was given at the Alexandra Theatre. The play was restaged in London on 27 March 1869 at the Gaiety Theatre, retitled Dreams. The London production featured Madge Robertson; it ran for 96 performances. Later in the same year A Breach of Promise ("An Extravagant Farce") was staged at the Globe Theatre, London, and Dublin Bay (a "comedietta") was performed at the Theatre Royal, Manchester.

In January 1870 Robertson was diagnosed as suffering from heart disease. He continued to write, and 1870 saw the production of Progress (adapted from Sardou) at the Globe, The Nightingale, a drama, at the Adelphi Theatre and his final work for the Prince of Wales's – M. P.. Robertson was an early beneficiary of improved financial terms for playwrights; the practice of payment by royalties was not widespread until the 1880s, but the management of the Prince of Wales's had paid him £1 a night for Society in 1865, and by the time of this final piece his nightly fee had risen to £5. He was also – most unusually for the period – paid for revivals. He was unable to supervise the production of M. P. or even to attend the first night. The company went to his house and gave him a private performance.

A comedy called Birth was presented by Sothern at the Theatre Royal, Bristol, followed by a provincial tour. Against medical advice Robertson attended the first night of a revival of Ours at the Prince of Wales's on 26 November. The following month he travelled to Torquay on doctor's orders, but found no improvement in his health and returned to London after two weeks. He was too ill to have any hand in the production of his last play, War, a drama staged at the St James's Theatre on 16 January 1871.

Robertson died at his home in Chalk Farm, London on 3 February 1871, aged 42. He was buried in Abney Park Cemetery. More than a thousand people attended the funeral, including the entire company of the Prince of Wales's, led by Marie Wilton, who placed a chaplet of flowers on the coffin. The theatre was closed that night in tribute to Robertson – an exceptional honour, according to The Times:

Plays

Robertson's reputation rests on his series of plays for Marie Wilton's company at the Prince of Wales's Theatre. They were seen as "problem plays", because they dealt seriously and sensitively with social issues of the day. Caste was about marriage across the class barrier and Society explored prejudice against social mobility. The plays were notable for what the critic Thomas Purnell dubbed their "cup and saucer" realism, treating contemporary British subjects in settings that were recognisable, unlike the oversized acting in Victorian melodramas that were popular at the time. The characters spoke in normal language rather than declaiming their lines. Looking back thirty years later at the original production, Bernard Shaw called Robertson's play Caste "epoch making ... After years of sham heroics and superhuman balderdash, Caste delighted everyone by its freshness, its nature, its humanity".

Shaw was mistaken in supposing everyone was delighted: some critics wrote that there was nothing in Robertson's plays but commonplace life represented without a trace of wit and sparkle, and absurdly realistic. More typical was the comment by a correspondent in The Era shortly after Robertson's death, asking who else could "successfully break, as he did,  the trammels of conventionalism, and show us upon the stage living, breathing figures of flesh and blood, who walk, talk, act and think as tangible men and women really do in this work-a-day world of ours".

Some later analysts have disputed whether Robertson really originated some of the innovations attributed to him. In a 1972 study Errol Durbach suggests that "the 'revolution' had been initiated in France years before by Scribe and  Sardou, those forerunners of the bourgeois domestic theatre and the well-made play". Durbach adds that in England, Vestris was staging plays "with a scrupulous concern for realistic detail", and Bulwer Lytton was already writing "the sort of play that would later be called  'Robertsonian'". Booth (2004) comments that Robertson "was neither the herald of a new drama nor the apostle of a new realism, in spite of the claims of some of his successors and of later historians. He affirmed middle-class values rather than questioned them".

Although Robertson's reputation as a revolutionary dramatist is debated, his importance in the development of modern stagecraft is generally agreed. Before him, star actors usually had control of scripts, and theatre managers had control of casting. Robertson insisted on retaining control over his scripts and casting and required that his actors follow his directions – a novel concept at that time. Dion Boucicault had been a forerunner, directing spectacular productions of his own plays, but Robertson applied the directorial precept to English domestic drama for the first time. Unlike Boucicault he did not act in his plays but applied himself exclusively to directing (or as it was called at the time "stage management") and in that capacity he could focus on ensemble and balance. Gilbert attended Robertson's rehearsals and later directed his own plays and operas based on what he had learned. He said of Robertson:

The actor-manager John Hare, who appeared under Robertson's direction at the Prince of Wales's, wrote:

As well as Gilbert, Hare and Shaw, leading theatrical figures who were influenced by Robertson included Arthur Wing Pinero and Harley Granville-Barker. The idealistic young playwright Tom Wrench in Pinero's Trelawny of the 'Wells' (1898) is an affectionate portrait of Robertson, of whom Pinero said, "If it hadn't been for Robertson I should never have been able to do what I have done, and that applies to the other fellows".

Original plays by Robertson

Source:  T. Edgar Pemberton's edition of Society and Caste, 1905.

Adaptations

Source: Pemberton.

Unperformed

Source: Pemberton.

Notes, references and sources

Notes

References

Sources

External links

Biography of Gilbert that includes info on Robertson
Photo of Robertson
Article on realism, naming Robertson as a proponent
Schoch, Richard, Performing Bohemia (2004)

People associated with Gilbert and Sullivan
1829 births
1871 deaths
People from Newark-on-Trent
Burials at Abney Park Cemetery
English male dramatists and playwrights
19th-century English dramatists and playwrights
19th-century British male writers